A corporation is a company or group of people authorized to act as a single entity (legal person) and recognized as such in law. Commercial corporations can take many forms, including statutory corporations, corporations sole, joint-stock companies, cooperatives and others.

The term is also part of the expression municipal corporation used only in formal contexts to refer to local governing bodies, although these are not commercial entities. 

Corporation may also refer to:

Education, establishments and organisations
 Harvard Corporation, AKA "the Corporation"
 Corporation (nightclub), nightclub in Sheffield, England
 The Corporation, Cardiff, public house in Wales
 "The Corporation", a press moniker for the Cuban-American criminal organization led by José Miguel Battle Sr.
 The Corporation (professional wrestling), late 1990s villainous stable in the World Wrestling Federation
 Yale Corporation, AKA "the Corporation"

Film
 Corporation (TV series), 1975 Canadian television documentary series
 The Corporation (2003 film), 2003 Canadian documentary
 The Corporation (2012 film), Argentine film

Literature
Corporation (comics), fictional organization in the Marvel Universe
The Corporation, fictional mercenary organization in Clive Cussler's Oregon Files novels

Games
Corporation (role playing game)
Corporation (video game)

Music
The Corporation (record production team), group of American songwriters and record producers in the 1960s Motown label
The Corporation (American band), an American, psychedelic rock band, active in the 1960s
The Corporation (English band), English, all-star, pop group who released a single in 1988
"Corporation" (song), a song by Jack White

See also
 City of London Corporation, the municipal governing body of the City of London in England
 Corporate (disambiguation)
 Corporation (feudal Europe), an aggregation of business interests into a single legal body
 Corporation Bank, former state-owned banking company, India
 Corporation Building, Sydney, Australia
 Corporation Park, Blackburn, England
 Corporation Street, Birmingham, England
 Corporatism, the economic system
 The Corp or Students of Georgetown, Inc., student-owned non-profit organization at Georgetown University in Washington, D.C.